Dr. David Geller is the Richard L. Simmons Professor of Surgery at the University of Pittsburgh School of Medicine, and co-director of the UPMC Liver Cancer Center. As a hepatobiliary Surgical Oncologist, his clinical interests center on the evaluation and management of patients with liver cancer. He has pioneered laparoscopic liver resections, and has performed more than 300 of these cases. Most of these patients are discharged home on the second post-operative day with four to five band-aid-sized incisions. He also specializes in performing laparoscopic radiofrequency ablations of liver tumors. Dr. Geller is a member of many professional and scientific societies including the American Surgical Association, Society of Surgical Oncology, Society of University Surgeons (Past President 2010), and the American Society of Transplant Surgeons.

Research
Geller has published over 200 scientific papers and chapters. He is often a guest lecturer speaking on the management of liver tumors and has presented at more than 320 meetings or seminars. He has active research grants from the NIH, and is also the Principal Investigator on Industry-sponsored clinical trials for liver cancer.

Selected publications

 Gamblin TC, Holloway SE, Heckman JT, Geller DA. Laparoscopic resection of benign hepatic cysts: a new standard. J. Am. Coll. Surg. 2008; 207: 731–6.
 Nyugen KT, Gamblin TC, Geller DA. World review of laparoscopic liver resection - 2,804 patients. Ann. Surg., 2009, 250:831-841.
 Nyugen KT, Laurent A, Dagher I, Geller DA, et al. Minimally invasive liver resection for metastatic colorectal cancer: a multi-institutional, international report of safety, feasibility, and early * outcomes. Ann. Surg. 2009; 250:842-848.
 Dagher I, O'Rourke N, Geller DA, et al. Laparoscopic major hepatectomy: an evolution in standard care. Ann. Surg. 2009; 250:856-860.
 Nyugen KT, Steel J, Vanounou T, Tsung A, Marsh JW, Geller DA, Clark Gamblin T. Initial presentation and management of hilar and peripheral cholangiocarcinoma: is a node-positive status or potential margin-positive result a contradiction to resection? Ann. Surg. Oncol. 2009; 16:3308-15.
 Vanouou T, Steel JL, Nyugen KT, Tsung A, Marsh JW, Geller DA, Gamblin TC. Comparing the clinical and economic impact of laparoscopic versus open liver resection. Ann. Surg. Oncol. 2010; 17:998-1009.
 Nguyen KT, Geller DA. Laparoscopic liver resection - current update. Surg. Clin. North Am. 2010; 90:749-60.
 Geller DA. P Preface. Liver surgery: from basics to robotics. Surg. Clin. North Am. 2010; 90:xvii-xviii.

On-line Videos
Laparoscopic resection of a benign liver mass

References

External links
UPMC Bio Page for Dr. David A. Geller, MD, FACS
UPMC Liver Cancer Center Home Page

Living people
Year of birth missing (living people)
American surgeons
American hepatologists
University of Pittsburgh faculty
Liver surgeons